The Scuppernong River is a blackwater river that flows through Tyrrell County and Washington County, North Carolina, into the Albemarle Sound. The river shares its name with the Scuppernong grapes native to the area.

Each October, Tyrrell County hosts an annual Scuppernong River Festival, a local tradition since 1991.

In 2004, the North Carolina State Parks System established the Scuppernong River Section of Pettigrew State Park, along the banks of the river, with the aid of The Nature Conservancy.

References

Rivers of North Carolina
Rivers of Tyrrell County, North Carolina
Rivers of Washington County, North Carolina
Tributaries of Albemarle Sound